Danielle Andersen (born May 21, 1984) is an American professional poker player previously sponsored by Ultimate Poker. Andersen's competitive nature led her to pick up the game after watching her future husband, and friends, play in college in 2003. Finding herself winning on a regular basis, she made a $50 deposit and never looked back.

Andersen's nickname is “dmoongirl.” Andersen was consistently found playing $25–$50 6-max cash games online – sometimes as high as $200–$400 prior to Black Friday. As one of the focal points in the online poker documentary, “Bet Raise Fold,” her life as a professional female poker player, wife, and mother was a highlighted character arcs in the documentary. The success of “Bet Raise Fold” catapulted her to becoming an even more recognizable face and name within the poker community.

While Andersen is primarily a cash game player she has played in some WPT and WSOP events. Her live tournament earnings total $136,180

In compliment to her poker career, upon signing with Ultimate Poker "dmoongirl" took her experience in front of the camera and became the face of Ultimate Poker's web series, ME vs. U. In ME vs. U, Andersen competes against fellow Ultimate Poker pro, Dan O'Brien in challenges. The winner gets a reward and the loser is punished.

Personal life
Danielle Andersen was born and raised in Minnesota. In 2014, Andersen moved to Las Vegas, Nevada with her family to pursue her online poker career with the United States' first regulated online poker site, Ultimate Poker. Her early adult life was captured on film in the documentary "Bet Raise Fold." A film about the coming of age of online poker, Andersen's life story unfolded. She was born and raised in rural Minnesota where she lived with her husband, Kory, and thirteen-year-old son, Easton. She has been supporting her family with online poker since 2004. Bluff Magazine named her one of poker's "Leading Ladies." BET RAISE FOLD followed Danielle as she pursued her dreams of sponsorship in order to secure a better future for her family. Years after the documentary premiered, Andersen signed a sponsorship deal with Ultimate Poker.

Poker
Andersen has been playing poker since 2004 focusing mainly on Texas Hold'em cash games. Although online poker is her focus, Andersen also plays some live poker as well. During the summers, she can be found playing tournaments at the World Series of Poker as well as cash games.

Andersen is a frequent guest on the TV show Poker Night in America.

References

External links
 Danielle Andersen on Twitter

American poker players
Female poker players
People from the Las Vegas Valley
1984 births
Living people